Glyptostrobus is a small genus of conifers in the family  Cupressaceae (formerly in the family Taxodiaceae).  The sole living species, Glyptostrobus pensilis, is native to subtropical southeastern China, from Fujian west to southeast Yunnan, and also very locally in northern Vietnam and Borikhamxai Province of eastern Laos near the Vietnam border.

The genus formerly had a much wider range, covering most of the Northern Hemisphere, including the high Arctic in the Paleocene and Eocene. The oldest known fossils are late Cretaceous in age, found in North America. It contributed greatly to the coal swamps of the Cenozoic era. It was reduced to its current range before and during the Pleistocene ice ages.

Like the related genus Taxodium, it produces 'cypress knees' when growing in water, thought to help transport oxygen to the roots.

The species is nearly extinct in the wild due to overcutting for its valuable decay-resistant, scented wood, but it is also fairly widely planted along the banks of rice paddies where its roots help to stabilise the banks by reducing soil erosion.

References

External links
Gymnosperm Database: Glyptostrobus
Arboretum de Villardebelle: photo of cone

Cupressaceae
Conifer genera
Deciduous conifers